Gassenhauer nach Hans Neusiedler (1536), commonly known as Gassenhauer, is a short piece from Orff Schulwerk, developed during the 1920's by Carl Orff with long-time collaborator Gunild Keetman. As the full title indicates, it is an arrangement of a much older work by the lutenist Hans Neusidler from 1536. It (along with several other Orff Schulwerk pieces) is credited to Keetman on a 1995 release of the Schulwerk. As with many other pieces from the Schulwerk, it has been used multiple times on television, radio, music and in films, including the films Badlands (1973), True Romance (1993) (arrangement by Hans Zimmer), Ratcatcher (1999), Finding Forrester (2000), Monster (2003), Michael Moore's Capitalism: A Love Story (2009), The Simpsons 22nd-season episode "The Scorpion's Tale" (2011), Friend of the World (2020), The Simpsons 33rd-season episode "Mothers and Other Strangers" (2021) and Mad God (2021). The piece was used as the theme music for an afternoon radio program also titled Gassenhauer on the classical music station WCLV in Cleveland, Ohio, in the 1970s.

References 

Music education
Compositions by Carl Orff